Dan Gardner may refer to:

Dan Gardner (footballer) (born 1990), English footballer
Dan Gardner (politician), American politician from Oregon